Alexander Grant Rennie (28 September 1959 – 4 December 2013) was a South African slalom canoer who competed in the early 1990s. He finished 36th in the K-1 event at the 1992 Summer Olympics in Barcelona. Rennie died in a plane crash in 2013.

References

Alexander Rennie's profile at Sports Reference.com
Alexander Rennie's obituary

1959 births
2013 deaths
Canoeists at the 1992 Summer Olympics
Olympic canoeists of South Africa
South African male canoeists
Victims of aviation accidents or incidents in 2013
Victims of aviation accidents or incidents in South Africa